The 2018 OFC U-19 Championship was the 22nd edition of the OFC U-19/U-20 Championship, the biennial international youth football championship organised by the Oceania Football Confederation (OFC) for the men's under-19/under-20 national teams of Oceania. The qualifying stage was held in the Cook Islands between 26 May – 1 June 2018, and the final tournament was held in Tahiti between 5–18 August 2018.

Before the tournament in 2016, the age limit was reduced by a year to 19 years of age. However, the last tournament remained the name U-20 Championship. For this tournament, the name has changed to U-19 Championship. So, players who wanted to participate in the tournament needed to be born on or after 1 January 1999. At an OFC Executive Committee meeting held at its Auckland headquarters in November 2013 the competition format was modified. The competition was brought forward a year and the age limit was lowered to 19 years of age. The changes were made in order to allow the winner of the competition plenty of time for preparation and player development for upcoming World Cups at Under 20 level.

In March 2015, FIFA decided that the OFC gets two slots at every FIFA U-20 and U-17 World Cup. So, the top two teams of the tournament qualified for the 2019 FIFA U-20 World Cup in Poland as the OFC representatives. New Zealand, the defending champions, won the title for the seventh time, and qualified together with runners-up Tahiti.

Format
The tournament structure was as follows:
Qualifying stage: The four teams from the "developing associations" (American Samoa, Cook Islands, Samoa and Tonga) played in the qualifying stage. The winner of the round-robin tournament qualify for the final tournament.
Final tournament: A total of eight teams (Fiji, New Caledonia, New Zealand, Papua New Guinea, Solomon Islands, Tahiti, Vanuatu, and the qualifying stage winner) played in the final tournament. For the group stage, they were divided into two groups of four teams. The top two teams of each group advance to the knockout stage (semi-finals and final) to decide the winner of the OFC U-19 Championship and the two teams that qualify for the FIFA U-20 World Cup.

The draw for the tournament was held on 2 February 2018 at the OFC Headquarters in Auckland, New Zealand. In both the qualifying stage and the final tournament, the hosts (Cook Islands and Tahiti) were assigned to position A1 in the draw, while the remaining teams were drawn into the other positions without any seeding.

Teams
All 11 FIFA-affiliated national teams from the OFC entered the tournament.

Note: All appearance statistics include those in the qualifying stage (since 2016).

Venues
The hosts of the qualifying stage and final tournament were announced by OFC on 31 October 2017.
The qualifying stage was played at the CIFA Academy Field in Rarotonga, Cook Islands.
The final tournament was played at the Stade Pater and Stade Fautaua in Pirae, Tahiti.

After two Group B matches were played at Stade Fautaua on 6 August, it was announced on 8 August that the remaining Group B matches would be moved to Stade Pater due to the floodlights being deemed less than optimal. However, it was announced on 10 August 2018 that after heavy rain caused the pitch of Stade Pater to deteriorate, the last two Group A and Group B matches on 11 and 12 August would be moved to Stade Fautaua with earlier kick-off times (12:00 and 15:00 instead of 15:00 and 18:00).

Squads

Players born on or after 1 January 1999 are eligible to compete in the tournament. Each team can name a maximum of 20 players.

Qualifying stage
The winner advance to the final tournament (group stage).

All times are local, CKT (UTC−10).

Group stage
The top two teams of each group advanced to the semi-finals.

All times are local, TAHT (UTC−10).

Group A

Group B

Knockout stage

Bracket

Semi-finals
Winners qualify for 2019 FIFA U-20 World Cup.

Third place match

Final

Winners

Goalscorers
In the qualifying stage 
In the final tournament 
In total,

Awards
The Golden Ball Award was awarded to the most outstanding player of the tournament. The Golden Glove Award was awarded to the best goalkeeper of the tournament. The Golden Boot Award was awarded to the top scorer of the tournament. The Fair Play Award was awarded to the team with the best disciplinary record at the tournament.

Qualified teams for FIFA U-20 World Cup
The following two teams from OFC qualified for the 2019 FIFA U-20 World Cup.

1 Bold indicates champions for that year. Italic indicates hosts for that year.

Notes

References

External links
2018 OFC U-19 Championship, oceaniafootball.com
News > 2018 OFC U-19 Championship, oceaniafootball.com

2018
2017–18 in OFC football
2018–19 in OFC football
2018 in Cook Islands sport
2018 in French Polynesian sport
2018 Ofc U-19 Championship
2018 Ofc U-19 Championship
May 2018 sports events in Oceania
June 2018 sports events in Oceania
August 2018 sports events in Oceania
2018 in youth association football
2019 FIFA U-20 World Cup qualification